The Vor Game is a science fiction novel by Lois McMaster Bujold, first published in September 1990. It won the 1991 Hugo Award for Best Novel. The Vor Game is a part of the Vorkosigan Saga, and is the sixth full-length novel in publication order, and is the sixth story, including novellas, in the internal chronology of the series. It was included in the 1997 omnibus Young Miles.

Plot summary 
Miles Vorkosigan graduates from the Academy, but is upset to learn he is being sent to replace the weather officer at the Empire's winter infantry training base on remote Kyril Island. He is somewhat mollified by the placement officer's explanation that the posting is to see if he can handle the discipline and military routine. If he can, he will be reassigned to a more desirable posting. However, he cannot help but get into trouble.

Miles refuses to obey what he deems a criminal order by the base commander, who has him arrested for mutiny, and as he is high Vor, technically treason. He is quickly returned to the capital and sequestered in the bowels of Imperial Security (ImpSec) by Simon Illyan, who, along with his father, concludes that Miles had behaved correctly, but has also gained notoriety for his insubordinate action and cannot expect to serve in any branch of the Imperial Service, with one possible exception. Miles' father, Aral Vorkosigan, persuades Illyan to transfer Miles to ImpSec, despite Illyan's and Miles' reluctance.

Miles, sent to help evaluate the Hegen Hub (and remain conveniently out of the way). There, under his cover identity of an arms dealer, he is framed for murder and arrested. While in custody, he is startled to find Emperor Gregor in the same cell. Gregor tells him that he ran away during a visit to Komarr and joined a merchant ship's crew as a navigator, but was then left behind without pay at Consortium Station and jailed for vagrancy. Miles attempts to extricate Gregor, but is soon up to his neck in a mysterious plot involving an amoral femme fatale, his homicidal former Kyril Island commanding officer, and Hub power politics. Miles encounters his Dendarii mercenary friends and, after once again outmaneuvering their leader, Admiral Oser, resumes command under his Admiral Naismith persona. He is able to rescue Gregor from the femme fatale (an extremely devious, short mercenary leader herself) and get the mutually suspicious Hegen Hub planets to present a united defense to repel a surprise attack by a Cetagandan invasion fleet, with timely help from Barrayaran reinforcements jointly commanded by his father and Gregor.

Afterward, Gregor and ImpSec decide to put the Dendarii on permanent secret retainer for covert missions, with Miles officially installed as liaison.

"The Weatherman" 

The first several chapters of The Vor Game (chapter 1 through part of chapter 6) were originally published in a slightly different form as a novella entitled "The Weatherman" in the February 1990 issue of Analog magazine. The story covers Miles's assignment to Kyril Island through his arrest and the beginning of his detention at ImpSec.

Awards
The Vor Game won the Hugo Award for Best Novel in 1991. It also received a nomination for a Locus Award that same year.

References 

1990 American novels
1990 science fiction novels
American science fiction novels
Hugo Award for Best Novel-winning works
Novels by Lois McMaster Bujold
Vorkosigan Saga